Logan County Council may be:

Logan County Council (West Virginia)
Logan County Council (Illinois)